Emma Le Blanc (born December 12, 1998) is a Canadian curler from Fredericton, New Brunswick. She is the former third on Team Justine Comeau.

Career
Le Blanc has represented New Brunswick at four Canadian Junior Curling Championships with two bronze medals to her name in 2016 and 2018. She also has a very accomplished Under 18 championship record. She won silver medals in both 2016 and 2017 at the 2016 U18 International Curling Championships and the 2017 Canadian U18 Curling Championships. Still of junior age, she has participated in the past few New Brunswick Scotties Tournament of Hearts. In 2017, they lost the semifinal to the Melissa Adams rink and in 2018 they lost the tiebreaker to Sarah Mallais. She did not participate in the 2019 playdowns as she was at the 2019 Canadian Junior Curling Championships.

Personal life
Le Blanc currently attends Mount Allison University and is an arts student.

Teams

References

External links

Living people
Canadian women curlers
Curlers from New Brunswick
Sportspeople from Fredericton
Mount Allison University alumni
1998 births